The Malang City Regional People's Representative Council is the unicameral municipal legislature of the city of Malang, East Java, Indonesia. It has 45 members, who are elected every five years, simultaneously with the national legislative election.

History
Malang was granted its status as a municipality by the Dutch East Indies government in 1914, with the municipal council founded on 6 October 1914. During the Dutch period, the council consisted of 11 members, of which 8 were Dutch, 2 were native Indonesians, and the last seat was allocated for non-native groups such as Arabs or Chinese. 

Under an independent Indonesia, the city council was reestablished in 1950, as a provisional legislature. The first elected council served between 1951 and 1956. 

In 2018, 41 out of 45 members of the legislature were arrested as suspects for bribery, in a case which also implicated mayor Mochammad Anton. The arrested members were accused of having received payments ranging from Rp 12.5 to 50 million (USD 842 to 3,368) in order to approve the proposed municipal budget in 2015. 40 replacements were sworn in around a week following the arrests in order to maintain the municipal government's functions. 40 of the suspects were found guilty of the charges, and received sentences ranging from 4 to 5 years.

Composition
For the 2019–2024 period, PDI-P is the largest party in the legislature, with 12 seats. Its leadership consists of a speaker and three deputy speakers.

Members are assigned into one of four commissions – Commission A on government, Commission B on Economics and Finance, Commission C on Development, and Commission D on Public Welfare.

Election
In the 2019 election, the city was divided into five multi-member electoral districts from which the legislators were elected. The electoral districts are coterminous with the 5 city districts.

References

Malang
Municipal councils in Indonesia
Government agencies established in 1914